Prashant or Prasant  is a common male name in South Asia.  It is derived from the word "shanth" which means patience, calm, quiet, or tranquil.

People with the given name
 Prashant Bose    - Indian politician
 Prashant Bhushan - Indian lawyer, activist and politician
 Prashant Damle   - Indian actor
 Prashant Pandey  - Indian writer, director
 Prashant Pathak  - Canadian investor, businessman and philanthropist
 Prashant Shah    - Bollywood producer
 Prashant Singh   - Indian politician
 Prashant Singh Rawat - Indian basketball player
 Prashant Tamang  - Indian singer and film actor

Variations
 Prashanta Nanda - Indian film actor
 Prashanth - Indian actor
 Prashanthini - Indian playback singer

Given names